The Shorapani uezd was a county (uezd) of the Kutaisi Governorate of the Caucasus Viceroyalty of the Russian Empire. It bordered the Racha uezd to the north, the Kutaisi uezd to the west, and the Tiflis Governorate to the east. The area of the uezd corresponded to most of the contemporary Imereti region of Georgia. The administrative center of the Shorapani uezd was Kvirila (present-day Zestaponi).

History 
The Shorapani uezd was formed in 1846 as part of the Kutaisi Governorate on the territory of the historical region of Imereti during the time of the Russian Empire. In 1918, the Kutaisi Governorate including the Shorapani uezd was incorporated into part of the Democratic Republic of Georgia.

Administrative divisions 
The subcounties (uchastoks) of the Shorapani uezd in 1913 were as follows:

Demographics

Russian Empire Census 
The majority of the population indicated Georgian to be their mother tongue, with significant Imeretian and Mingrelian speaking minorities.

Kavkazskiy kalendar 

Notes

References

Bibliography 

Uezds of Kutaisi Governorate